Gymnázium Jura Hronca (GJH) is a gymnasium (grammar school) located in Bratislava, Slovakia.

The school has a focus on the study of natural sciences, mathematics, and computer sciences. However its affiliation with the International Baccalaureate, an active bi-lingual (English – Slovak) programme and the option to study several foreign languages such as French and German, the school has a strong reputation for the study of foreign languages.

In the school year 2005/2006, GJH launched lower programs of IB Primary Years Programme and IB Middle Years Programme.

The school has been recently known as the "Spojená škola Gymnázium Jura Hronca a ZŠ Košická" (United school of the Gymnázium Jura Hronca and the Košická Primary School) after a merge with the primary school Základná škola a osemročné gymnázium Košická sharing the same building.

History
The school was founded on January 9, 1959 as an 11-year secondary school. In the school year 1969/70 the school is granted the status of a Gymnasium, named after the Slovak mathematician Jur Hronec.

International Baccalaureate
Spojená škola Novohradská has been an IB World School since June 1994. It offers the IB Primary Years Programme (since 2009), IB Middle Years Programme (since 2009) and IB Diploma Programme (since 1994). It's the only school in Slovakia to offer all 3 programmes (as of 2023).

Alumni
2024 - Adam Gergely

Student Activities

Bratislava Model United Nations
Students from Gymnazium Jura Hronca organize the BratMUN conference held in Bratislava.

The Jur Hronec Cup
The Jur Hronec Cup (súťaž o džbán Jura Hronca) is a competition between all classes of the school. 
During the year, classes earn points in different activities (Sports day, different competitions) and in the end of the year, the winner receives money and school-free days for a class-trip and the right to hold The Jur Hronec Cup for the next year.

Eschenbach
The Gymnazium Jura Hronca organises every year a school exchange with the Gymnasium Eschenbach in Bavaria, Germany. This school event takes place every year, the 2011 trip being the 20th, with a special trip to Belgium included in the program. This exchange is organized by Dr. Jan Mayer from the Slovak side, and from Dr. Hans Schmid from the German side.

References

External links 
 Homepage
 GJH Evaluation Report 2010/2011
 GJH 2010/2011 Leavers Higher Education Statistics
 Official BratMUN Homepage
 An article about the 2010 BratMUN in the SME daily.

Education in Bratislava
International Baccalaureate schools